This is a list of all the aircraft either partially or fully indigenously developed by Pakistan.

Manned fighter aircraft
 JF-17 Thunder
 F-16  Fighting Falcon

Trainer aircraft
 MFI-17 Mushshak
 MFI-395 Super Mushshak
 K-8 Karakorum

Unmanned aircraft
 NESCOM Burraq
 GIDS Shahpar
 GIDS Uqab
 SATUMA Jasoos

Science and technology in Pakistan
Aircraft manufactured in Pakistan
Pakistan